Minister of Territory Administration and State Reform of Angola is a cabinet level position in the national government. The position was established in 1991 with Lopo Fortunato Ferreira do Nascimento.

Name changes
 1991–2017: Minister of Territory Administration
 2017–present: Minister of Territory Administration and State Reform

Ministers of Territory Administration and State Reform
 1991–1992: Lopo Fortunato Ferreira do Nascimento
 1992–1994: António Paulo Kassoma
 1994–1997: José Aníbal Lopes Rocha
 2002–2004: Fernando Faustino Muteka
 2004–2010: Virgílio Ferreira de Fontes Pereira
 2010–2017: Bornito de Sousa Baltazar Diogo
 2017–present: Adão Francisco Correia de Almeida

References

External links

 http://www.mat.gov.ao/

Territory Administration
Territory Administration Ministers
Politics of Angola